Benjamin David Hodfinger Stevens (born 5 May 1992) is a Jersey international cricketer. In 2014 he played in the 2014 ICC World Cricket League Division Four and he was selected in the Jersey squad for the 2015 ICC World Twenty20 Qualifier tournament.

In September 2017, he took the most wickets for Jersey in the 2017 ICC World Cricket League Division Five tournament, with a total of fourteen dismissals in five matches.

In April 2018, he was named in Jersey's squad for the 2018 ICC World Cricket League Division Four tournament in Malaysia. He was named as the player to watch in the squad ahead of the tournament. He was the leading run-scorer for Jersey in the tournament, with 253 runs in six matches, and the leading wicket-taker for his side, with thirteen dismissals. The International Cricket Council (ICC) named him as the player of the tournament.

In August 2018, he was named in Jersey's squad for the 2018–19 ICC World Twenty20 Europe Qualifier tournament in the Netherlands. He was the leading wicket-taker in Group B of the tournament, with fourteen dismissals in six matches.

In May 2019, he was named in Jersey's squad for the 2019 T20 Inter-Insular Cup against Guernsey. He made his Twenty20 International (T20I) debut for Jersey against Guernsey on 31 May 2019. The same month, he was named in Jersey's squad for the Regional Finals of the 2018–19 ICC T20 World Cup Europe Qualifier tournament in Guernsey.

In September 2019, he was named in Jersey's squad for the 2019 ICC T20 World Cup Qualifier tournament in the United Arab Emirates. In November 2019, he was named in Jersey's squad for the Cricket World Cup Challenge League B tournament in Oman. He made his List A debut, for Jersey against Uganda, on 2 December 2019.

References

External links
 

1992 births
Living people
Jersey cricketers
Jersey Twenty20 International cricketers
Place of birth missing (living people)